Salkisar (also Romanized as Salkīsar and Selkī sar; also known as Salkasar and Sil’kasar) is a village in Lakan Rural District, in the Central District of Rasht County, Gilan Province, Iran. At the 2006 census, its population was 711, in 175 families.

References 

Populated places in Rasht County